Vanguard class may refer to:

 , UK Royal Navy 19th-century second rate tall ship class
 , UK Royal Navy World War II era super-battleship class
 , UK Royal Navy post-Cold-War era ballistic missile submarine class
 , Royal Norwegian Navy cancelled proposed ship class
 "Vanguard" class of locomotives, built by Thomas Hill (manufacturer)

See also

 , British Royal Navy shipname
 Vanguard (disambiguation)